"Stereo Love" is a song recorded by Romanian DJ Edward Maya with Moldovan-Romanian musician Vika Jigulina, released as their debut single in 2009 from Maya's album, The Stereo Love Show. The refrain is from "Bayatılar", composed by Azerbaijani musician Eldar Mansurov. It became a worldwide hit in nightclubs and rose to the top of eleven national music charts and was certified eight-times Platinum in Norway, seven-times Platinum in Sweden, and Gold or higher in ten additional countries.

The song and the music video were both included on the compilation NRJ Music Awards 2010. The music video was filmed in Mykonos, Greece, as Maya stated in an interview that Greece "was a place that I fell in love with". The song won the Top Dance Song Award at the 2011 Billboard Music Awards.

Composition
"Stereo Love" is set in common time with a moderate tempo of 127 beats per minute. It is set in the key of C minor with a simple chord progression of Cm–A–E–Gm. The song is most notable for featuring a riff played with a concertina by Maya.

Lyrically, the song speaks of a passionate love between two people that is now dying, and their struggle to rekindle that flame.

Copyright controversy
In the autumn of 2009, during his stay in Greece, Azerbaijani composer Eldar Mansurov contacted the Romanian Office for Copyright claiming the refrain of "Stereo Love" was a copy of a tune from his popular 1989 composition "Bayatılar". In the video clip, the composer of "Stereo Love" was indicated as "anonymous". Both the Office and Edward Maya later confirmed that Mansurov's work was in fact used in the making of "Stereo Love". Maya commented by saying he was "fascinated" by the accordion version of "Bayatılar" he had come across on the Internet earlier in 2009 and claimed he had tried to contact the author but failed due to his busy schedule. On 19 January 2010, Edward Maya arrived in Baku, Azerbaijan, where he signed an agreement with Eldar Mansurov affirming their co-authorship of "Stereo Love".

The keyboard riff of this song was also used as a theme to "Zalim", a ubiquitous song written by the Turkish singer and songwriter Sezen Aksu, first recorded and released in 1995 by her former bassist and backing vocalist Levent Yüksel which was a hit that year, and then in 1996 by Sezen Aksu herself.

Chart performance
On the issue date 17 October 2009, the song debuted at number 12 on the French Digital Singles Chart. It became number one on 22 November 2009, with more than 6,142 copies sold. It reached its highest-weekly sales on 3 January 2010 with 9,763 sales. The song remained at number one for a total of eight-consecutive weeks. On the issue date 22 November 2009, "Stereo Love" debuted at number 2 on the French Physical Singles Chart and became number one on 27 December 2009. In Belgium, the single entered at number 40 on 28 November 2009 and reached a peak of number 2 eleven weeks later. In the Netherlands, it was ranked for two weeks atop, eleven weeks in the top 10 and 17 weeks in the top 40. In Switzerland, the single debuted at number 3 and peaked at number 2. It began at the number-one spot in the French-speaking part of Switzerland (Romandy), where it stayed 5 weeks. In the UK, the song entered the UK Singles Chart at number 4. In Ireland, the first week of release, the unofficial DJ Team version proved to be more popular (number 8 on the IRMA chart) than Edward Maya's (number 17); however, on 21 May 2010 the former dropped three places to number 11 while the latter jumped eleven positions to number 6 just before reaching a week later the top of the chart where it has been for four-consecutive weeks.

Outside of Europe, "Stereo Love" also enjoyed success in the Middle East, US, and Canada. It debuted on the U.S. Billboard Hot 100 at number 93 on the week ending 23 October 2010 and peaked at number 16. In 2011, it peaked at number 11 on the Mainstream Top 40 chart.

In the United States, the single entered the Billboard Hot Dance Airplay chart at number 23 in the 17 April 2010 issue. During its second week it slipped to number 25, but in its fourth week saw a major move in the 8 May 2010 issue, moving from number 25 to number 8, the biggest-jump ever on the chart, and ultimately reaching the number one position three times. The single was released by Ultra Music, the same label that also scored another top 10 hit in 2010 with another song, "Hot" by Romanian singer Inna, which also went all the way to number one, thus giving Ultra Music the distinction of having artists from the same country reach number one in the same year with debut singles on the same chart. It would become the number one Dance Airplay single of 2010 on the Billboard Year-End issue. As of September 2012, the song has sold 2,226,000 copies in the US.

On the Italian FIMI chart the song peaked at number 4 for two non-consecutive weeks in April 2010 and spent 17 weeks within the top 10. "Stereo Love" is the longest-charting song in the history of the European Hot 100, accumulating 47 weeks.

The official "Stereo Love" music video has received over 520 million YouTube views, with other copies and forms of the song and video receiving several million views. The music video was also the most popular video uploaded on Spinnin' Records' YouTube channel until 10 April 2014, when the views were surpassed by Martin Garrix's music video for his song "Animals." The music video for "Stereo Love" was shot in the island of Mykonos, in Greece.

Track listings
Digital single 
 "Stereo Love" – 4:07
 "Stereo Love"  – 5:21
 "Stereo Love"  – 3:04
 "Stereo Love"  – 4:37
 "Stereo Love"  – 2:52
 "Stereo Love"  – 5:02
 "Stereo Love"  – 5:03
 "Stereo Love"  – 3:02

Digital single: The Italian Remixes 
 "Stereo Love"  – 2:52
 "Stereo Love"  – 3:02
 "Stereo Love"  – 5:02
 "Stereo Love"  – 5:03
 "Stereo Love"  – 4:37
 "Stereo Love" – 4:07
 "Stereo Love"  – 5:21

CD single 
 "Stereo Love"  – 3:04
 "Stereo Love"  – 2:52
 "Stereo Love"  – 3:02
 "Stereo Love"  – 4:07

Other 
 "Stereo Love"  – 4:10
 "Stereo Love"  – 4:16

Other version
 "Stereo Love"  – 6:44
 "Stereo Love"  – 3:39
 "Stereo Love"  – 3:50
 "Stereo Love"  – 5:24

Alfredo Nini version
 "Stereo Love"  – 4:11
 "Stereo Love"  – 5:09
 "Stereo Love"  – 5:08

Timmy Trumpet & Wildstylez version
 "Stereo Love"  - 3:16
 "Stereo Love"  - 4:10
 "Stereo Love"  - 3:58
 "Stereo Love"  - 4:56

Official Remixes
 "Stereo Love"  - 2:36
 "Stereo Love"  - 3:29
 "Stereo Love"  - 3:37
 "Stereo Love"  - 2:43

Charts and certifications

Weekly charts

Monthly charts

Year-end charts

Certifications

Release history

Mia Martina version

Ultra Music hired Canadian singer Mia Martina to record an official remix of Maya's "Stereo Love". The rights to an official remix were acquired by Ultra Music from Romanian label Cat Music.

It was released to the United States on iTunes on 10 August 2010 and in the Canadian market in September 2010 from Martina's debut album, Devotion. The music video was directed by Marc André Debruyne.

The original version by Maya and Vika Jigulina was already a top 20 hit on the Canadian Hot 100, peaking at number 19 before it was outpeaked by the version promoted with Mia Martina, reaching number 10.

Peak positions

Certifications

References

2009 songs
2009 debut singles
2010 singles
CP Music Group singles
Ultra Music singles
Sony Music singles
Spinnin' Records singles
Edward Maya songs
Eurodance songs
Dutch Top 40 number-one singles
Irish Singles Chart number-one singles
Number-one singles in Finland
SNEP Top Singles number-one singles
Number-one singles in Spain
Number-one singles in Sweden
Number-one singles in Norway
Songs involved in plagiarism controversies
Sampling controversies
Songs written by Don Omar
Songs written by Vika Jigulina
Songs written by Edward Maya
Song recordings produced by Edward Maya